Manuscripts Don't Burn (translit. Dast-Neveshtehaa Nemisoozand) is a 2013 Iranian drama film directed by Mohammad Rasoulof about a failed attempt to kill a busload of Iranian writers in 1996. It was screened in the Un Certain Regard section at the 2013 Cannes Film Festival where it won the FIPRESCI Prize. It was screened in the Contemporary World Cinema section at the 2013 Toronto International Film Festival.

Reception 

On Rotten Tomatoes, the film has an aggregate score of 93% based on 25 positive and 2 negative critic reviews. The website consensus reads: "Brave, challenging, and brimming with rage, Manuscripts Don't Burn is a political statement as much as it is a gripping thriller."

References

External links
 

2013 films
2013 drama films
2010s Persian-language films
Iranian drama films